Hugh Armstrong Robinson (May 13, 1881 – 1963) was a pioneer in the earliest days of aviation, combining his skills of inventor, pilot, and daredevil. Among other things, he is said to have been the third person to successfully fly an aircraft after the Wright Brothers in a plane of his own design and construction and the first person to make an air-sea rescue. His many firsts also include the first medical flight transporting a doctor to patient in Hammond, N.Y. in June 1912 and first U.S. airmail flight in 1911. Robinson also devised the term and art of dive-bombing.

Biography
Robinson was born on May 13, 1881 in Neosho, Missouri.

In late 1910, Hugh Robinson became a pilot and chief engineer for Glenn Curtiss at Curtiss Aviation, North Island, California. There he coined the term and invented the tailhook system that helped make possible Eugene Ely's first ever flight, on January 18, 1911, to the deck of a ship, the USS Pennsylvania, by allowing the airplane to stop quickly and safely. This system is used by Navies worldwide to the present day. Robinson took part in Curtiss' development of hydroplanes. In 1911 he took a hydroplane on the exhibition circuit, flying at demonstrations and fairs across North America and Europe.

At Kinloch Field in St. Louis, Missouri on March 1, 1912, Albert Berry made the first successful parachute jump, from a Benoist Airplane, designed and built by Hugh Robinson and Tom Benoist. He landed safely on the Jefferson Barracks parade grounds. The parachute and the apparatus used to support and release it were also designed and built by Robinson. Also in 1912, Robinson took a Curtiss Hydroplane to Europe at Monaco and flew impressively in an aviation meet there.

During the Great Lakes Reliability Cruise in 1913,  Thomas W. Benoist entered three aircraft, flown by Antony Jannus, Hugh Robinson, and Benoist himself.

He performed a motorcycle stunt dubbed the "Circle of Death". The Neosho Daily News February 3, 1914 reported, "Instead of using the revolving globe, his is a revolving ring, fourteen feet in diameter, latticed or banded in such a way that he is plainly visible at all times to the audience. Inside of the ring is a single track, twenty-four inches wide, upon which he rides his motorcycle. The effect of the act given by the ring revolving in numerous different ways makes the audience see him ride in a different direction at each revolution of the ring. The entire ring and motorcycle are illuminated with electric lights, and give a wonderful effect." The account states that the act ran 12 extra hazardous minutes and that Robinson would "give his act, which he calls the Circle of Death, a try out at the Princess Theatre"...and would be with the Barnum & Bailey Circus that summer. It was the highest paid act at the time.

Robinson was the first person to complete a 360-degree vertical loop in an airplane and the first right turn; it was previously thought this maneuver would tear the plane apart.

After a long danger-filled life, surviving 15 major crashes and a massive train wreck, he died not quite two months short of his 81st birthday, March 23, 1963 of natural causes at his home at Tacoma Park, MD.

Legacy
In 1999, U.S. Congressman Roy Blunt gave a tribute to Hugh Armstrong Robinson; it is recorded in the Congressional Record, v.145, pt.11. Shortly after, during Neosho's Independence Day Celebration the Neosho Municipal Airport, Neosho, Missouri was dedicated and renamed Neosho Hugh Robinson Airport in his honor.

Resources
Hugh Robinson - Pioneer Aviator(1995), George L. Vergara. Gainesville, FL: University Press of Florida.

References

External links
 EarlyAviators.com

1881 births
1963 deaths
People from Neosho, Missouri
American aerospace engineers
Aviators from Missouri
Aviation pioneers
Members of the Early Birds of Aviation
20th-century American inventors